Vela 4B (also known Vela 8 and OPS 6679) was an American reconnaissance satellite to detect explosions and nuclear tests on land and in space. It was released together with Vela 4A, ERS 18, OV5 1 and OV5 3.

Instruments
 2 optical bhangmeters observing Earth
 12 external X-ray detectors
 18 internal neutron and gamma-ray detectors

See also 
 Vela (satellite)

References 

1967 in spaceflight
Military space program of the United States